Berte Canutte Aarflot (3 January 1795 – 29 October 1859) was a Norwegian Christian hymnwriter and author within the Haugean Movement (haugianere).

Personal and early life
Berte Canutte Aarflot was born at Årflot, a family farm in the parish of Ørsta in Møre og Romsdal, Norway to Sivert Aarflot (1759–1817) and his wife Gunhild Rasmusdotter Eikrem (1756–1836). The family moved  to the village of Ekset in Volda  when she  was four years old. Berte Canutte gained knowledge of the pietism teachings of Hans Nielsen Hauge as a small child, and around 1800 joined a small circle of Haugeans led by Vebjørn Svendsen in Volda. 
Berte Canutte learned writing at home and by maintaining letter correspondence with fellow Haugeans. 
At the age of twelve, Berte Canutte started writing spiritual hymns. Her father was a newspaper publisher who had set up the first library and printing house in the village. He was impressed by her writings and in the last of his life recommended she publish them for a larger audience. He recommended the title En gudelskende Siels opbyggelige Sange (A God-Worshiping Soul's Edifying Hymns). The booklet was released in 1820 by her older brother Rasmus Aarflot (1792–1845), who continued the Aarflot printing firm after the death of their father in 1817.<ref>[https://nbl.snl.no/Sivert_Aarflot  Sivert Aarflot - Bonde, Lensmann og  Trykkerieier (Norsk biografisk leksikon. Jostein Fet)]</ref>

Later life and death
On 7 June 1816, Berte Canutte married Amund Knutsson Hovdenakk (1788-1860), son of farmer Knut Jonsson Hovdenakk (c. 1734–1790) and his wife Mari Eliasdotter Mele (1744–1830). They maintained a farm at Årflot from 1819 to 1852, and together had seven children. The farm hosted gatherings for fellow Haugeans.  In 1822, a visit with the lay minister Amund Knutsson Brekke (1776-1835) from the island of Gurskøya inspired Berte Canutte to remain a humble and loyal servant of Jesus Christ in her writing and speech. She continued with her spiritual writings throughout the remainder of her life. Berte Canutte Aarflot died of brain hemorrhage in 1859.

Bjørnstjerne Bjørnson wrote the following about her in Aftenbladet:

This affectionate woman has lived for the edification of the many. Her deep, religious songs remain a treasure in every farmer's house from Trondheim to Bergen County; and have also traveled beyond the country and is being sung in the neighbouring countries.  One might say about her, that few in this country have in a wide area contributed that much to the growth of religion as her.

Legacy
The Student Administration Building, with library and auditorium, at Volda University College is named Berte Kanutte Aarflot-bygg in her honor.

WorksEn gudelskende Siels opbyggelige Sange, 1820Troens Frugt. En Samling af aandelige Sange; i tvende Dele, 1830Troens Frugt. En Samling af religiøse Opmuntrings og Opbyggelses-Breve, 1844Sjælens Morgen- og Aftenoffer. Bønner, Sukke og Sange paa hver Dag i Ugen tilligemed Sange paa de fire Aarets Tider, 1846Sjælens aandelige Høitidsglæde, indeholdende Bønner og Sange paa de i Aaret indfaldende Høitidsdage, 1853Leilighedssange, 1853Religiøse Breve til Opmuntring og Opbyggelse samt Bestyrkelse i Tro, Haab og Kjærlighed, 1853Smuler til Næring for Livet i Gud. En Samling af Skrifter, 1856–62Berte Kanutte Siversdatter Aarflots Selvbiografi, indeholdende Optegnelser om hendes aandelige Livsudvikling, tilligemed Sognepræst Wraamanns Tale ved hendes Grav samt nogle Mindesange, 1860Før ikke udgivne Breve og Sange, utg. ved B. Støylen og H. G. Heggtveit, som del 3 i Berte Kanutte Aarflot. To Livsskildringer, 1893

See also
Johannes Aarflot

Notes

References

Other sources
Fjæreide, Kari Hop (2012)  Berte Kanutte Siversdatter Aarflot: Omsorg for sjelen  (Det teologiske menighetsfakultet)

Related Reading
Grindal, Gracia  (2011) Preaching from Home: The Stories of Seven Lutheran Women Hymn Writers (Wm. B. Eerdmans Publishing) 
Wee, Mons Olson (1919) Haugeanism: A Brief Sketch of the Movement and Some of Its Chief Exponents'' (Harvard University)

External links
The History of Nordic Women's Literature - Berte Canutte Aarflot
Berte Kanutte-huset (Høgskulen i Volda)

1795 births
1859 deaths
Norwegian Lutheran hymnwriters
Norwegian songwriters
People from Møre og Romsdal
Women hymnwriters
19th-century women musicians
19th-century Norwegian women writers
19th-century Lutherans